K.V. Public School, or KVPS, is an Indian private educational institution located in Pariskshit Garh, Meerut, Uttar Pradesh, India, established in 1999. K.V. Public School is one of the oldest CBSE institutions in Parikshit Garh and in Meerut city.

The school is affiliated to CBSE, New Delhi (Affiliation Code: 2130520).

See also

 Central Board of Secondary Education

References

External links
 Official website

Primary schools in Uttar Pradesh
High schools and secondary schools in Uttar Pradesh
Schools in Meerut
Schools affiliated to CBSE
Educational institutions established in 1999
1999 establishments in Uttar Pradesh